The Canadian Operational Support Command (CANOSCOM) (in French : Commandement du soutien opérationnel du Canada or COMSOCAN) was one of seven commands of the Canadian Forces (CF) from 2006 to 2012. The command was replaced by the Canadian Joint Operations Command in October 2012. As a separate command, CANOSCOM provided the CF with combat support (including logistics, military engineering, land equipment maintenance services, communications and information systems, health services and military police) and service for both domestic and international missions.

Composition
CANOSCOM consisted of approximately 1,100 soldiers from all branches of the Canadian Forces who provided operations support to thousands of Canadian Forces members involved in many missions. CANOSCOM commanded the Canadian Forces Joint Support Group, the Canadian Forces Joint Signal Regiment and Canadian Materiel Support Group. CANOSCOM had oversight over 16 units and formations. These included the:

Canadian Materiel Support Group (CMSG)
 7 Canadian Forces Supply Depot
25 Canadian Forces Supply Depot
CF Ammunition Depot Bedford
CF Ammunition Depot Dundurn
CF Ammunition Depot Rocky Point
CF Ammunition Depot Detachment Angus
Canadian Forces Joint Signal Regiment
OS Engr Gp
1 Engineer Support Unit
Canadian Forces Joint Support Group
CFJSG HQ
3 Canadian Support Unit
4 Canadian Forces Movement Control Unit
CF Postal Unit
OS MP Gp
CFPSU

See also

 Military history of Canada
 History of the Canadian Army

References

External links 
 Canadian Operational Support Command website
 Library and Archives Canada - 7 Canadian Forces Supply Depot

Canadian Forces Operational Commands
Military logistics of Canada